This list of tallest buildings in Pretoria ranks completed buildings by height in  Pretoria, Gauteng, one of the three capital cities of South Africa. Pretoria's tallest building is the South African Reserve Bank Building built in 1988.

Tallest buildings 
This list ranks Pretoria's skyscrapers that stand at least 50 m (164 ft) tall, based on standard height measurement.

See also 

 Architecture portal
 List of tallest buildings and structures in South Africa
 List of tallest structures in South Africa
 List of tallest buildings in Cape Town
 List of tallest structures in the world by country
 List of World Heritage Sites in Africa
 List of tallest buildings in Africa

References 

Skyscrapers in South Africa
Tallest, Pretoria
South Africa, Pretoria
Pretoria-related lists
Buildings and structures in Pretoria